Arrochar and Tarbet railway station is a railway station on the West Highland Line in Scotland. It stands between the villages of Arrochar and Tarbet. It is sited  from Craigendoran Junction, near Helensburgh, between Ardlui and Garelochhead. ScotRail manage the station and operate most services, others provided by Caledonian Sleeper.

History 

Opened to passengers on 7 August 1894 by the West Highland Railway, then run by the North British Railway, it became part of the London and North Eastern Railway during the Grouping of 1923. The station was host to a LNER camping coach from 1936 to 1939.

Known as the Wee Arrochar, the Craigendoran service was continued by British Rail until June 1964, when it fell victim to the Beeching Axe.

Between 1945 and 1948 a station and passing loop were located to the east of Arrochar and Tarbet at Inveruglas which served the passenger and freight requirements of the Sloy hydroelectric scheme.
The station then passed on to the Scottish Region of British Railways on nationalisation in 1948.

A camping coach was also positioned here by the Scottish Region from 1964 to 1969 after which all camping coaches in the region were withdrawn.

Facilities 
Facilities on the island platform include two waiting rooms, benches, bike racks, a help point and a phone. There is also a car park by the entrance to the station. As the station is only accessible via subway, there is no step-free access. As there are no facilities to purchase tickets, passengers must buy one in advance, or from the guard on the train.

Passenger volume 

The statistics cover twelve month periods that start in April.

Services 
Monday to Saturday, there are six services to Oban and three to Mallaig (the latter combined with Oban portions, dividing at ), and one service to Fort William (the Highland Caledonian Sleeper, weekday mornings only) northbound. Southbound, there are six services to Glasgow Queen Street High Level and one service to London Euston via Queen Street Low Level & Edinburgh Waverley (the Highland Caledonian Sleeper - does not run on Saturday).

On Sundays, there are two trains northbound to Mallaig, the Caledonian Sleeper to Fort William and one extra to Oban only, plus an extra summer service to Oban; Southbound there are three trains southbound to Glasgow Queen Street. In summer months, the extra summer Sunday service returns to Edinburgh, avoiding Glasgow.

References

Bibliography

External links

 RAILSCOT on the West Highland Railway
 Station on navigable O.S. map
 Video footage of Arrochar & Tarbet railway station

Railway stations in Argyll and Bute
Former North British Railway stations
Railway stations in Great Britain opened in 1894
Railway stations served by ScotRail
Railway stations served by Caledonian Sleeper
Loch Lomond
James Miller railway stations